Shout It Out is the third album by singer Patrice Rushen. This album was the last Patrice released with Prestige Records before signing with Elektra Records. With this album, Rushen performs songs ranging from jazz, funk and fusion to R&B.

Track listing
All tracks composed by Patrice Rushen, except where indicated.
 "The Hump" (Darryl Cox, Patrice Rushen) – 6:04
 "Shout It Out" – 6:14
 "Stepping Stones" (Charles Mims) – 5:00
 "Let Your Heart Be Free" (Angela Rushen, Patrice Rushen) – 3:58
 "Roll With the Punches" – 6:17
 "Let There Be Funk" (Darryl Cox, Patrice Rushen) – 4:16
 "Yolon" (Reggie Andrews) – 4:32
 "Sojourn" – 4:43

Personnel 
 Patrice Rushen – lead vocals (1-4, 6, 8), electric piano (1-5, 7, 8), clavinet (1, 2, 5, 6), handclaps (1, 4, 6), arrangements (1, 2, 4-8), tambourine (2, 5), Minimoog (3, 6, 7), electric bass (4), backing vocals (4), high bass (5), Yamaha electric grand piano (5, 8), ARP synthesizer (7) Bosendorfer grand piano (8), synth horns (8), synth strings (8), choir vocals (8)
 Mitchell Bagman – additional Minimoog (6) 
 Larry Nash – synth horns (7, 8), synth strings (7, 8)
 Reggie Andrews – synth horns (7, 8), synth strings (7, 8), arrangements (7)
 Al McKay – guitars (1, 3, 4, 6, 7, 8)
 Charles Meeks – electric bass (1, 2, 3, 6, 7, 8), handclaps (1, 4, 6), backing vocals (1, 2, 3), thumbed bass (5), choir vocals (8)
 James Gadson – drums (1-7), "right" drums (8)
 Graham Lear – "left" drums (8)
Bill Summers – percussion (2-8)
 Tom Scott – tenor saxophone (2), lyricon (2)
 Nate Alford – trumpet (1, 3, 5), handclaps (1, 4, 6)
 Charles Mims – trumpet (1, 3, 5), handclaps (1, 4), arrangements (3)
 Danny Vicari – trumpet (1, 3, 5), handclaps (1, 4)
 Tommy Vicari – whistle (6)
 Darrell Cox – handclaps (1, 4)
 Ferd Porche – handclaps (1, 4)
 Ronnie Williams – handclaps (1, 4)
 Roslyn Barbee – handclaps (1, 4)
 Josie James – backing vocals (1, 6), handclaps (1, 4, 6), choir vocals (8)
 Maxine Waters – backing vocals (2, 3), handclaps (6)
 Roy Galloway – backing vocals (2, 3, 6), handclaps (6), choir vocals (8), vocal solo (8)

Production 
 Producers – Patrice Rushen, Reggie Andrews and Tommy Vicari.
 Executive Producer – Orrin Keepnews
 Production Assistance – Charles Mims 
 Engineer – Tommy Vicari
 Assistant Engineers – Danny Vicari and Helen Silvani
 Mastered by Bernie Grundman at A&M Studios (Hollywood, CA).
 Art Direction and Design – Phil Carroll
 Photography – Phil Bray

References 

1976 albums
Patrice Rushen albums
Prestige Records albums